Richard Allen Shapiro (born June 27, 1934) and Esther June Shapiro (née Mayesh; born June 6, 1928) are an American married couple who work as television screenwriters and producers, through their Shapiro Film Corporation. They are best known as the creators of the long-running 1980s prime time soap opera Dynasty, its spin-off series The Colbys, and the 1991 miniseries Dynasty: The Reunion.

In 1984, Doubleday/Dolphin published the companion book Dynasty: The Authorized Biography of the Carringtons, which included an introduction by Esther Shapiro.

Dynasty
The Shapiros created and produced the prime time soap opera Dynasty, which debuted in 1981. Written as the Shapiros' creative response to the 1979 oil crisis, and intended by ABC to be a competitor for CBS's Dallas, the series ranked #28 its first season. Ratings steadily grew, with Dynasty reaching #1 for the 1984–85 season. A spin-off, The Colbys, debuted in 1985, but was cancelled after two seasons. Dynasty was cancelled in 1989, with the Shapiros writing and producing a reunion miniseries in 1991.

During Dynasty run, the Shapiros also co-created the prime time soap opera Emerald Point N.A.S., which lasted for one season from 1983 to 1984, and the medical drama HeartBeat, which ran two seasons from 1988 to 1989.

At the height of Dynasty popularity in 1985, Joe Klein of New York called Esther "the ABC network's most valuable asset ... and perhaps the most influential woman executive in television". Dynasty producer Aaron Spelling and others compared Esther to her creation, Blake Carrington (John Forsythe).

Dynasty legacy
In January 2004, Esther Shapiro participated in a marathon of the show's episodes on SOAPnet, Serial Bowl:  Alexis vs. Krystle, giving behind-the-scenes tidbits and factoids.

In 2005 Ritchie Singer and Pamela Reed portrayed the Shapiros in Dynasty: The Making of a Guilty Pleasure, a fictionalized ABC television movie based on the creation and behind the scenes production of Dynasty.

The first season of Dynasty was released on Region 1 DVD an April 19, 2005 by 20th Century Fox Home Entertainment. This edition includes audio commentary by Esther Shapiro.

The Shapiros announced on January 12, 2011, that they had written a Dynasty prequel feature film script set in the 1960s, and were shopping it to studios for a possible film franchise. In a September 2011 interview, Dynasty actress Joan Collins chatted about a Dynasty television revival: "I've been in constant contact with Esther Shapiro, who wrote it, and apparently they've written a script."

In September 2016, it was announced that a Dynasty reboot was in development at The CW, with the Shapiros attached as producers. The project received a series order in May 2017, and premiered in the US on October 11, 2017. On April 2, 2018, The CW renewed Dynasty for a second season.

Credits

References

External links
 
 
 "Lifestyles of the rich and the ruthless", The Boston Globe, April 17, 2005
 "Dynasty Heirs Remember the Beginning", Scott Halloran, BoxOfficeMojo.com, April 22, 2005
 
 
 
 

American screenwriters
American soap opera writers
American television producers
Married couples